Václav František Kocmánek (1607–1679) was a Baroque Czech poet, author, and historian of great synthesis.

After the White Mountain (1620 ), converted to Catholicism. Prakticky celý život působil jako učitel v Praze. Practically all his life he worked as a teacher in Prague.

External links
Extensive Biography 

Czech poets
Czech male poets
1607 births
1679 deaths